Commendation Medal may refer to:
 Commendation Medal, a mid-level United States military decoration presented for sustained acts of heroism or meritorious service
 Pingat Kepujian (Commendation Medal), Singaporean civil commendation medal
 Pingat Penghargaan (Tentera) (Commendation Medal (Military)), Singaporean military commendation medal